Andrew Fairbairn (18 December 1862 – 24 July 1925) was a New Zealand cricketer. He played two first-class matches for Otago in 1884/85.

Fairbairn was born in County Cork in Ireland in 1862. He worked as a merchant.

References

External links
 

1862 births
1925 deaths
New Zealand cricketers
Otago cricketers
People from Mallow, County Cork